Saïd Amara (11 March 1933 – 2 August 2020) was an Algerian football player and manager.

Playing career

Club career
Born in Saïda, Amara started playing club football for Gaité Club Saida and SC Bel Abbès. In 1956, he moved to France to play for Strasbourg, Béziers and Bordeaux. He returned to Algeria, playing with MC Saïda and JSM Tiaret.

International career
He spent time with the FLN football team in 1960 to 1962, and received death threats upon his return to Bordeaux.
He also earned five caps for the Algerian national team between 1963 and 1964.

Coaching career
Amara had two spells as manager of the Algerian national team. He also managed many clubs, including MC Saïda, ES Mostaganem, MC Oran, GC Mascara and Al-Ahly Benghazi.

References

1933 births
2020 deaths
People from Saïda
Algerian footballers
FLN football team players
MC Saïda players
RC Strasbourg Alsace players
AS Béziers Hérault (football) players
FC Girondins de Bordeaux players
JSM Tiaret players
Ligue 1 players
Ligue 2 players
Association football midfielders
Algerian expatriate footballers
Algerian expatriate sportspeople in France
Algerian expatriate sportspeople in Libya
Expatriate footballers in France
Expatriate football managers in Libya
Algerian football managers
Algerian expatriate football managers
Algeria national football team managers
MC Saïda managers
JSM Tiaret managers
ES Mostaganem managers
MC Oran managers
GC Mascara managers
Al-Ahly SC (Benghazi) managers
21st-century Algerian people
Algeria international footballers